The Chenghuang Temple of Hsinchu is a temple located in Hsinchu, Taiwan. It is dedicated to City God or Cheng Huang Ye (城隍爺), who is believed in Chinese religion to record the good and bad deeds of every people residing in the particular city. Common prayers made within the temple are for better lives, to seek for justice and to avoid flood and drought.

History 

The Chenghuang Temple of Hsinchu was built in 1747 during the Qing dynasty. Due to the influence of the Qing Emperors, Hsinchu became a prefecture and as such, the temple also rose in status. In 1891, prior to the first Sino-Japanese War and the subsequent Japanese rule of Taiwan, the Guangxu Emperor held a large prayer meeting in Taiwan and chose the temple as the meeting place. After the ceremony Guangxu presented the temple with a sign board reading "Golden Gate Protection", which signifies that the Chenghuang of Hsinchu protects and gives blessings to the entire country.

Story 
During the Qing Dynasty (1644-1911), the emperor's son supposedly took a boat with his wet nurse to fish. Then, they got lost on the sea. The boat kept floating on the sea and stranded on shore of a small island off Taiwan. The wet nurse got sick and died, however the emperor's son was saved by the chief of the island. Then, the emperor's son went to the Fragrant Hill of Hsinchu in Taiwan. At that night, the magistrate of Hsinchu dreamed that the City God of Hsinchu told to him that the emperor's son was at the Fragrant Hill. Then the magistrate found the emperor's son and brought him back home. After this event, the emperor gave the Chenghuang of Hsinchu a praise, “Awesome and magical Duke, City God of Hsinchu”

Feature 
The temple features six halls, each of which have their own meaning. The names of the halls are “Bell and Drum Tower”, “Main Hall”, “Back Hall”, “Horenji”, “Sanchuan Hall”, and “Protection Room”.

Activities 
Twelve activities are held yearly at the temple, which includes the parade of the Chenghuang. During this parade many Taiwanese will leave home in order to join in the festivities and some will set off fireworks and pray to Chenghuang.

References 

Religious buildings and structures in Hsinchu
Taoist temples in Taiwan
Temples in Hsinchu